kT (also written as kBT) is the product of the Boltzmann constant, k (or kB), and the temperature, T. This product is used in physics as a scale factor for energy values in molecular-scale systems (sometimes it is used as a unit of energy), as the rates and frequencies of many processes and phenomena depend not on their energy alone, but on the ratio of that energy and kT, that is, on  (see Arrhenius equation, Boltzmann factor).

More fundamentally, kT is the amount of heat required to increase the thermodynamic entropy of a system by k.

In physical chemistry, as kT often appears in the denominator of fractions (usually because of Boltzmann distribution), sometimes β = 1/kT is used instead of kT, turning  into .

RT
RT is the product of the molar gas constant, R, and the temperature, T. This product is used in physics and chemistry as a scaling factor for energy values in macroscopic scale (sometimes it is used as a pseudo-unit of energy), as many processes and phenomena depend not on the energy alone, but on the ratio of energy and RT, i.e. E/RT. The SI units for RT are joules per mole (J/mol).

It differs from kT only by a factor of the Avogadro constant, NA. Its dimension is energy or ML2T−2, expressed in SI units as joules (J):
kT = RT/NA

References

Thermodynamics
Statistical mechanics